Koningic acid (KA, also known as heptelidic acid) is a potent, selective, irreversible GAPDH inhibitor.  It is also a DNA polymerase inhibitor.  The koningic acid molecule, produced by fungi that consume sweet potatoes, has been shown to curb the excessive glucose consumption in tumors exhibiting the Warburg effect and leaving healthy cells alone.

References

Carboxylic acids
Sesquiterpenes
Lactones
Epoxides